Edward Phillips (2 September 1892 – 8 January 1971) was an Australian cricketer. He played in three first-class matches for South Australia between 1919 and 1921.

See also
 List of South Australian representative cricketers

References

External links
 

1892 births
1971 deaths
Australian cricketers
South Australia cricketers
Cricketers from Adelaide